Vladimir Ivanovich Sushiy (born 26 June 1960) is a retired Russian professional footballer. He made his professional debut in the Soviet Second League in 1982 for FC Mashuk Pyatigorsk.

References

1960 births
Living people
Soviet footballers
Russian footballers
Association football forwards
Russian expatriate footballers
Expatriate footballers in Belarus
Russian Premier League players
FC Shakhtar Horlivka players
FC Rotor Volgograd players
FC Dynamo Stavropol players
FC Akhmat Grozny players
FC Lokomotiv Nizhny Novgorod players
FC Fandok Bobruisk players
FC Mashuk-KMV Pyatigorsk players